Saint-Roch-de-l'Achigan is a Quebec municipality located in the Montcalm Regional County Municipality located in the Lanaudière region. It is on the banks of the Achigan River, a tributary of the L'Assomption River. According to the town's website, the population is approximately 5,100  and growing steadily as a result of the suburban sprawl in the North Shore of Greater Montreal.

History
The first settlers arrived near the 1770s and built a flour mill on a township located alongside the Rivière de l'Achigan. The area was located on the northern edges of the first developed lands that were located along both sides of the Saint Lawrence River. In 1787, the Saint-Roch-de-l'Achigan Parish was formed and in 1832, its post office opened, three years after the construction of its first school. In 1845, the parish municipality was established. It was abolished in 1847 when it became part of the County Municipality of Lachenaie, but was reestablished in 1855 as the Parish Municipality of Saint-Roch.

In 1921, Saint-Roch lost a part of its territory when the Municipality of Saint-Roch-Ouest was formed. In 1957, it regained its original name when "de-l'Achigan" was added in order to distinguish it from other places named "Saint-Roch". In 2006, it changed statutes and became the Municipality of Saint-Roch-de-l'Achigan.

Transportation
The town is accessible via Autoroute 25 which links Laval and Montreal towards the northeastern suburbs including Terrebonne and Mascouche. Since the Olivier-Charbonneau Bridge connecting Montreal and Laval was opened to traffic in 2011, it also has a direct link to the south shore of Montreal and Autoroutes 20 and 40. The municipality is located near the northern terminus of the Autoroute which continues further north via Route 125 towards the Mont-Tremblant Provincial Park north of Saint-Donat and Rawdon.

Demographics
Population trend:
 Population in 2016: 5147 (2011 to 2016 population change: 5.2%)
 Population in 2011: 4892 (2006 to 2011 population change: 10.0%)
 Population in 2006: 4449
 Population in 2001: 4164
 Population in 1996: 4305 (or 4343 when adjusted to 2001 boundaries)
 Population in 1991: 3795

Private dwellings occupied by usual residents: 2032 (total dwellings: 2099)

Mother tongue:
 English as first language: 0.3%
 French as first language: 97.9%
 English and French as first language: 0.2%
 Other as first language: 1.6%

Education

Commission scolaire des Samares operates francophone public schools:
 École secondaire de l'Achigan
 École Notre-Dame

The Sir Wilfrid Laurier School Board operates anglophone public schools, including:
 Joliette Elementary School in Saint-Charles-Borromée
 Joliette High School in Joliette

See also
 List of municipalities in Quebec

References

External links

 Website of the Municipality

Municipalities in Quebec
Incorporated places in Lanaudière